Gülay Doğu Barbarosoğlu is a Turkish industrial engineer and academic administrator who served as rector of Boğaziçi University.

Education 
Barbarosoğlu graduated from Robert College in 1974. She earned a bachelor's degree (1978) and a PhD (1985) in industrial engineering at Boğaziçi University.

Career 
In 2000, Barbarosoğlu was promoted to full professor of industrial engineering at Boğaziçi University. She taught courses in mathematical optimization, logistics, operations, and decision-making. Barbarosoğlu was vice rector of research in Boğaziçi from 2008 to 2012. From 2012 to 2016, she served as rector of Boğaziçi University.

Barbarosoğlu retired from academia in 2016.

References 

Living people
Year of birth missing (living people)
Place of birth missing (living people)
Rectors of Boğaziçi University
Turkish engineering academics
Turkish industrial engineers
21st-century women engineers
20th-century women engineers
Women heads of universities and colleges
Academic staff of Boğaziçi University
Boğaziçi University alumni
Robert College alumni